Scopula alstoni is a moth of the family Geometridae. It was described by Prout in 1919. It is endemic to Sri Lanka.

References

Moths described in 1919
alstoni
Endemic fauna of Sri Lanka
Moths of Sri Lanka
Taxa named by Louis Beethoven Prout